Mitte is a borough of the city of Wiesbaden, Hesse, Germany. With over 21,000 inhabitants, it is one of the most-populated of Wiesbaden's boroughs. It is located in the centre of the city.

Places and Buildings of Interest 
 Schloßplatz
 
 Neues Rathaus
 Marktkirche
 Stadtschloss, today Hessischer Landtag
 Dernsches Gelände
 Backside from Neues Rathaus
 Wilhelmstraße
 Hessische Staatskanzlei / Kranzplatz
 Kochbrunnenplatz / Kranzplatz
 

References

Sources 
 Derived from German Wikipedia

External links 
 Official Wiesbaden-Mitte website (in German)

Boroughs of Wiesbaden
Historic districts in Germany